Fraulautern Abbey was a community of Augustinian canonesses of the nobility, founded in the 12th century; it was suppressed in the 1790s during the French Revolution.

Abbey buildings 
The abbey buildings, which are still extant in part, are located in Fraulautern, now part of Saarlouis in Saarland, Germany. Between the French Revolution and 1936, when Fraulautern was incorporated into Saarlouis (then known as Saarlautern), the buildings were used as the town hall. They are now used by the Grundschule of Fraulautern under the name "Im Alten Kloster".

Abbesses
From R. Rudolf Rehanek:

 c. 1160: Margarethe
 1169–1197: ?
 c. 1225: Meisterin J.
 1225–1236: ?
 1241: Berta
 1260: Jutta
 1262–1269: ?
 1269–1279: Gertrud
 1289: Elsa
 1296: Havils Nonneyer
 1299, 1303: Mathilde von Herbitzheim
 1308–1312: Hanvela
 1312–1335: Elisabeth von Saarbrücken
 1353–1344: Hildegarde
 1344: Esebet
 1354: ?
 1357–1373: Gudela
 1395: Aleyt von Castel
 1403: Lysa von der Neuerburg
 1406, 1443: Katharina von Wolfstein
 1448–1472: Margarethe von Huntingen
 1472–1492: Katharina von Bettingen
 1492–1507: Eva Huberissen von Schellodenbach (Schallodenbach)
 1507–1522: Margarethe von Wolfstein / Gertrud Brederin von Hohenstein
 1550–1560: Hildegard von Becheln
 1565–1587: Margarethe von Bübingen / Apollonia von Gressnich
 1587–1598: Apollonia von Gressnich / Agnes Braun von Schmidtburg
 1617–1622: Johanetta von Wiltz
 1622–1626: Anna Maria von Geispoltzheim
 1626–1633: Gabriele de Braubach
 1646–1677: Dorothea Braun von Schmidtburg
 1677–1691: Carolina von Hagen
 1691–1695: Arnolda Elisabeth von Weller
 1700: Odilia Braun von Schmidtburg
 1708: A. E. von Metzenhausen
 1720–1730: A. M. von Geispitzheim
 1730–1757: Maria Theresia de Saintignon
 1757–1773: Maria Helene von Rathsamshausen
 1773–1791: Sophie von Neuenstein

References

Nunneries in Germany
Buildings and structures in Saarlouis (district)